Un romance singular is a 2022 Peruvian romantic comedy film written, directed and produced by Wesley Verástegui. Starring Javiera Arnillas, Marina Kapoor & Santiago Cáceres. It premiered on January 6, 2022 in Peruvian theaters.

Synopsis 
It tells the story of a young conservative who meets a former sex worker, without imagining that they would both fall in love that same day, ignoring the past and the secrets that each one keeps, turning this romance into a battle of fear, revelations, where the love will be affected and with no chance of winning.

Cast 
The actors participating in this film are:

 Javiera Arnillas as Kimberly
 Marina Kapoor as Tiffany
 Santiago Cáceres

Financing 
Un romance singular was financed by the Directorate of Audiovisual, Phonography and New Media of the Ministry of Culture of Peru (DAFO) and produced by V&R Films.

Controversy 
After its premiere, congresswoman Milagros Jáuregui de Aguayo of Renovación Popular spoke out against the film on social networks because, according to her, "evangelical believers are mentioned in a derogatory and negative way, which notoriously promotes religious discrimination ", and sent a letter to the Minister of Culture Gisela Ortiz asking for explanations about the financing and cultural contribution of the production. The director Wesley Verástegui responded to the parliamentarian that it is the members of his evangelical community who discriminate against the LGBT community.

References

External links 

 

2022 films
2022 romantic comedy films
2022 LGBT-related films
Peruvian romantic comedy films
Peruvian LGBT-related films
2020s Spanish-language films
2020s Peruvian films
Films set in Peru
Films shot in Peru
Films about prostitution
Films about trans women